Chandrakantha is a 1936 Indian, Tamil-language film directed by P. K. Raja Sandow.

Cast 
The following list was adapted from the book Thamizh Cinema Ulagam Part-1.

Male cast
Kali N. Rathnam  Thirukallur Bandaara Sannidhigal
T. R. B. Rao  Narayana Reddy, Subedar Annasamy
Pudukottai P. U. Chinnappa  Kandur Prince
M. Kosalam  Raghava Reddy
Aayiram Mugam S. Ramkumar  Detective Govindan
M. K. Gopalan  Sub-Magistrate Thandavarayan
N. S. Krishnan  Barber Muniyan
P. Sundar Rao  Kandur Regent
T. S. Kannan  Police constable Gundu Rao
T. S. V. Gopal  Moththaiyur Bandaara Sannidhigal
Master Shankar Rao  Kid Raghava Reddy
N. Ramanathan  Veera Reddy
N. A. Natesan  Karbar Ascetic

Female cast
Saraswathi  Chandravathana
A. K. Rajalakshmi  Chandrakantha
C. Padmavathi Bhai  Bhagyam
Leela Bhai  Kandur Queen
P. Susheela  Barber Suppi
T. K. Dhanalakshmi  Sangeetham
C. J. Kamakoti  Abhimaana Dasi
Harel  English Dasi
Ammukutti  Malayala Dasi
Ganga  Hindi Dasi
T. M. Alamelu  Dasi
Shanmugavalli  Dasi
Mahalakshmi  Dasi
K. M. Sethu Bai  Dasi

Production 
The film was produced under the banner Jupiter Pictures and was directed by P. K. Raja Sandow. J. R. Rangaraju wrote the story and dialogues. Cinematography was done by M. M. Purohit while editing was done by P. K. Raja Sandow. Audiography was done by Sripath Patel and Saiyed Mothimmaiah. Gokale was in-charge of Settings. The film was shot and processed at Saraswathi Cinetone, Pune.

The film was based on the life of Heads of religious mutts and caused an uproar when it was released. There were requests to ban the film.

Soundtrack 
No credits are given for Music Direction and lyrics. One kriti by Thiyagaraja – Nidhi Saala Sugama – was included in the film.

List of songs

Notes

References

External links 
 

1936 films